Joseph Morris may refer to:

Joseph Morris (architect) (1836–1915), English architect
Joseph Morris (Alberta politician) (1868–1937), politician in Alberta, Canada
Joseph Wilson Morris (1922–2021), U.S. federal judge
Joseph Morris (Ohio politician) (1795–1854), U.S. Representative from Ohio
Joseph Morris (died 1862), leader of a schismatic Latter Day Saint sect called the Church of the Firstborn
Joseph Robert Morris (1828–1885), American businessman and Mayor of Houston, Texas
Joseph W. Morris (politician) (1879–1937), U.S. Representative from Kentucky
Joseph W. Morris (educator) (1850–1913), lawyer and professor in South Carolina
Joseph M. Bachelor (1889–1947), author known commonly by the pen name Joseph Morris
Jo Morris (bowls), women's England international lawn and indoor bowler
Joseph Morris (sailor), American sailor
Joseph Acton Morris (1901–1987), English geographer and school teacher
Joseph B. Morris (born 1916/1917), American businessman whose business ventures with Bernard Garrett were dramatized in the 2020 film The Banker

See also
Joe Morris (disambiguation)